Wells Tannery is an unincorporated community in Fulton County, Pennsylvania, United States. Wells Tannery has a post office, with ZIP code 16691.

References

Unincorporated communities in Fulton County, Pennsylvania
Unincorporated communities in Pennsylvania